

Year 299 (CCXCIX) was a common year starting on Sunday (link will display the full calendar) of the Julian calendar. In the Roman Empire, it was known as the Year of the Consulship of Diocletian and Maximian (or, less frequently, year 1052 Ab urbe condita). The denomination 299 for this year has been used since the early medieval period, when the Anno Domini calendar era became the prevalent method in Europe for naming years.

Events 
 By place 
 Roman Empire 
 Peace of Nisibis: Emperor Diocletian signs a treaty with the Persian king Narseh that will last for 40 years. The Persians accept Roman dominion over Armenia, the Caucasus, and Upper Mesopotamia. The pro-Roman ruler Tiridates III receives all of Armenia as far as the border with Atropatene. Mirian III of the Kingdom of Iberia is made a Roman client, and at some point in time, as a result of the treaty, Caucasian Albania will follow suit. Rome also gains five satrapies beyond the Tigris, which are perhaps given to Tiridates to administer.
 To celebrate his victory over the Persians, Galerius commissions the Arch of Galerius in Thessaloniki (modern Greece).
 In this or the following year, Galerius campaigns with success against Sarmatians and the Marcomanni, attacking through a swamp to defeat a Sarmatian army.
 Having first crossed into Africa in 296, Emperor Maximian concludes his campaigns against the Quinquegentiani and other Berbers. His campaigns had ranged as far as Mauretania in the west and Tripolitania in the east. Julianus, a rebel leader in Africa, throws himself into a fire after the Romans breach the walls of his stronghold.
 Returning to Rome in triumph, Maximian commissions the Baths of Diocletian in honour of his 'brother' Diocletian. 
 Diocletian expels Christians from the Roman army.

 China 
 Empress Jia Nanfeng frames Crown Prince Yu for treason and has him deposed.

Births 
 Jin Mingdi, Chinese emperor of the Jin Dynasty (d. 325)

Deaths 
 Judah bar Ezekiel, Babylonian amora (b. 220)
 Qi Wannian, Chinese chieftain and rebel leader

References